A statue of James A. Garfield by Charles Henry Niehaus stands in Piatt Park, Cincinnati, Ohio, United States.

See also
 Statue of James A. Garfield (U.S. Capitol), also by Niehaus
 List of memorials to James A. Garfield
 List of sculptures of presidents of the United States

References

External links
 

1885 sculptures
Bronze sculptures in Ohio
Outdoor sculptures in Cincinnati
Relocated buildings and structures in Ohio
Sculptures of men in Ohio
Statues in Cincinnati
Cincinnati
1885 establishments in Ohio